Médina Yacine Ba is a village in the rural community of Coubalan, located in Tenghori Arrondissement and Bignona Department, a subdivision of the Ziguinchor Region in the historical region of Casamance in the south-west of the country.

Populated places in the Bignona Department
Arrondissement of Tenghory